A team of more than 150 athletes flew the flag for South Africa at the 2015 All-Africa Games in Brazzaville, Republic of the Congo in September.
South African athletes competed in a total of 15 different sports against their continental counterparts at the Games which ran 4–19 September while there was also representation by para-athletes in the power-lifting and athletics codes.

South African athletes participated in: athletics, badminton, basketball, boxing, cycling, fencing, gymnastics, judo, karate, swimming, table tennis, volleyball (beach), wrestling.

In total, 122 medals were won by South Africa.

Medalists

Results

Athletics

Men - Akani Simbine, Roscoe Engel, Henricho Bruintjies, Anaso Jobodwana, Wayde van Niekerk, Berend Koekemoer, Ofentse Mogowane, Mthembi Chauque, Rynardt van Rensburg, Johan Cronje, Dumisane Hlaselo, Stephen Mokoka, Antonio Alkana, Tshepo Lefete, Ruan de Vries, LJ van Zyl, Cornel Fredericks, Wouter Le roux, Lindsay Hanekom, Mpho Links, Chris Moleya, Eben Beukes, Ruswahl Samaai, Zarck Visser, Godfrey Khotso Mokoena, Orazio Cremona, Jaco Engelbrecht, Victor Hogan, Russell Tucker, Chris Harmse, Rocco van Rooyen, Philmar van Rensburg, Tobie Holtzhausen, Fredriech Pretorius, Willem Coertzen, Lebogang Shange, Wayne Snyman, Lusapho April
Women - Carina Horn, Justine Palframan, Tamzin Thomas, Caster Semenya, Claudia Heunis, Wenda Nel, Annerie Ebersohn, Marilize Higgins, Julia du Plessis, Geraldine King, Deone Joubert, Jo-Ane Van Dyk, Bianca Erwee, Lynique Prinsloo, Matsi Dikotla, Patience Ntshingila, Sonia Smuts, Ischke Senekal, Geraldine Duvenage, Sunette Viljoen, Gezelle Bernard, Zinzi Chabangu, Nieka Du Toit, June Roelofse, Anel Oosthuizen, Corli Swart

Para-athletics

Men - Danie Breitenbach, Hilton Langenhoven, Jonathan Ntutu, Fanie van der Merwe, Gerrit Hendricks, Tyrone Pillay, Heugene Murray, Michael Louwrens, Christiaan du Plessis, 
Women - Ilse Hayes, Johanna Pretorius, Liezel Gouws, Carley Lomax 
Officials - Karin Le Roux, Raymond Julius, Marius Wessels

Badminton

Men - Jacob Maliekal, Andries Malan, Willem Viljoen, Prakash Vijayanath 
Women - Elsie de Villiers, Michelle Butler-Emmett, Jennifer Fry, Sandra le Grange 
Officials - Willie Joseph, Christoffer Dednam

Boxing

Men - Sibusiso Bandla, Ayabonga Sonjica, Luvuyo Sizani, Akani Phuzi, Paul Schafer 
Officials - Johannes Prinsloo, Nkosinathi Hlatshwayo

Cycling

Men - Hendrik Kruger, Reynard Butler, Thulasizwe Mxenge, Gustav Basson, Stefan de Bod, Emile Jacobs
Women - Lise Olivier, Heidi Dalton, Anriette Schoeman, Zanele Tshoko 
Officials - Wimpie Gouws, David van Straaten, Brigitte Mileson

Fencing

Men - Robert McGregor, Alexander Collings, Mogamad Faai’q Gamieldien, Keith Sefularo, Sello Maduma, Joseph Maluleke, Thulani Manzini
Women - Juliana Barret, Gisele Vicatos, Aphiwe Tuku, Tamaryn Carfoot
Officials - Randall Daniels

Gymnastics

Men - Wilson Mafona, Terence Ledwaba, Ryan Patterson, Tiaan Grobler, Siphamandla Ngcobo
Women - Dominique Mann, Kirsten Beckett, Claudia Cummins, Bianca Mann, Angela Maguire, Tylah Lotter
Officials - Tseko Mogotsi, Alta Lategan, Ilse Laing, Andries Grobler

Judo

Men - Jacques van Zyl, Siyabulela Mabulu, Zack Piontek

Karate

Men - Michael du Plessis, Stefano Biagioni, Silvio Cerrone-Biagioni, Marius Madgwick, Jan Booysens, Sandile Makwali, Morgan Moss, Mphikeleli Mthimunye, Troy Futter, Theogran Pillay, Andre de Oliveira, Balungile Ncofe 
Women - Elsabe le Roux, Meghan Booyens, Noloyiso Bonga, Nicole Luther, Maxine Willemse 
Officials - Skosana Humphrey, Jody Young, Zachous Banyane

Swimming

In the swimming code Olympic gold medallist Chad le Clos will be joined by fellow gold medallist Cameron van der Burgh who won two silver medals at the recent FINA world championships in Russia.

Men - Alard Basson, Calvyn Justus, Alaric Basson, Chad le Clos, Martin Binedell, Daniel Marais, Myles Brown, Nico Meyer, David de Villiers, Caydon Muller, Richard Ellis, Daniel Ronaldson, Douglas Erasmus, Ayrton Sweeney, Clayton Jimmie, Brent Szurdoki, Edward Johannisen, Cameron van der Burgh 
Women - Jessica Lee Ashley – Cooper, Kelly Gunnell, Vanessa Mohr, Rita Naude, Charlise Oberholzer, Karin Prinsloo, Marlies Ross, Tatjana Schoenmaker, Megan van Wyk, Rene Warnes, Michelle Weber
Officials - Nellie Silent, Graham Hill, Igor Omeltchenko, Sibani Makhanya

Table Tennis

Women - Danisha Patel, Zodwa Maphanga, Khanyisile Madlala, Caitlin Lingeveldt 
Officials - Neville Parker

Volleyball (beach)

Men - Clinton Stemmet, Leo Williams
Women - Palesa Masinga, Randy Williams 
Officials - Gershon Rorich

Para-powelifting

Women - Chantelle Stierman
Officials - Anita Barnard

Wrestling

Men - Jan Combrinck, Barco Badenhorst, Tiaan van der Merwe, Andries Schutte, Gert Coetzee, Armando Hietbrink, Martin Erasmus
Women - Jeannie-Marie Coetzer, Zumicke Geringer, Refilwe Molongwana
Officials - Gert van der Merwe, Nico Coetzee

General team management

Chef de Mission – Ezera Tshabangu, Leon Fleiser, Zandi Monyadi, Isaac Mdaka, Jessica Choga, Kagisho Matolong, Reabetswe Mpete
Team attache - Pela Selomo
Medical team - Chief Medical Officer – Dr Jerome Mampane, Dr Kgomotso Mogapi, Dr Mapitsi Maphoto, Dr Santa-Marie Venter.
Chief Physiotherapist – Sandhya Silal, Fikile Phasha, Greshne Van Wyk, Sarah Jane Fergusen, Danielle Munezero, Ashleigh Hansen, Venter, Given Baloyi, Avirlash Lukhan, Siyabonga Kunene, Sergant Motha and Hugh Everson, Ugendrie Govender

External links
 List of South Africa's athletes to the 2015 All-Africa Games

References

Nations at the 2015 African Games
2015
All-Africa Games